Beyşehir is a large town and district of Konya Province in the Akdeniz region of Turkey. The town is located on the southeastern shore of Lake Beyşehir and is marked to the west and the southwest by the steep lines and forests of the Taurus Mountains, while a fertile plain, an extension of the lake area, extends in the southeastern direction. According to 2000 census, the population of the district is 118,144 of which 41,312 live in the town of Beyşehir.

History

The Hittite monument situated in Beyşehir's depending locality of Eflatunpınar, at a short distance to the northeast from the town, proves that the Hittite Empire had reached as far as the region, marking in fact, in the light of present knowledge, the limits of their extension to the southwest. Evidence points out that an earlier settlement, perhaps dating back to the Neolithic Age, was also located in Eflatunpınar.

The Beyşehir region corresponds to classical antiquity's Pisidia. At the location of the town itself there was in all likelihood a Greek city, which in one view was probably named Karallia, which was one of the two urban centers that surrounded the lake at the time, and in Roman times was known as Claudiocaesarea (Klaudiokaisareia), and Mistheia in Byzantine times. Another theory is that Beyşehir's site corresponds to that of Casae (Κἀσαι), the seat of a Christian diocese of the Roman province of Pamphylia, which under Roman rule included large parts of Pisidia.<ref>[https://books.google.com/books?id=LnMPAAAAYAAJ&dq=Pamphylia+Pisidia&pg=PA1067 Charles Anthon, A Classical Dictionary (Harper and Bros. 1845), p. 1067]</ref> The names of some of its bishops are given in documents concerning church councils held from 381 to 879.Pius Bonifacius Gams, Series episcoporum Ecclesiae Catholicae, Leipzig 1931, p. 450 No longer a residential bishopric, Casae in Pamphylia is today listed by the Catholic Church as a titular see.

The state of desolation into which the ancient city, whatever it was called, had fallen by the first decades of the 13th century is suggested by the name "Viranşehir" that the Seljuk Turks had given to the town, meaning "the desolate city"''. While the most precious finds of Kubadabad site date from the reign of Alaeddin Keykubad (1220–1237), it was a seasonal settlement area chosen by and for the sultans already in the late 12th century.

After the fall of the Seljuks, Viranşehir was renamed for a time as Süleymanşehir in honor of one of the beys of the region's ruling dynasty, the Eshrefids, who made the town into his capital. Since the beys of Eshrefids resided here, the present name of Beyşehir was gradually adopted for the town. The Great Mosque of Beyşehir built by the dynasty between 1296–1299, also called Eşrefoğlu Mosque, is considered one of the masterpieces of the intermediate period of Anatolian beyliks between the Seljuk and Ottoman architecture styles.

Notable natives  
 Suleiman Sirr Koydemir (Beshtoev) — is a well-known political and public figure in Turkey. Graduated from the Faculty of Law of the University of Konya. He served as Mayor of Beysehir. He was awarded the highest award of Turkey "Istiklal Medallion" (Medal of Freedom). Ingush by nationality. 
 Makki Sharif Bashtav — The largest Turkish medieval historian and Turkologist, Byzantine scholar and specialist in Hungarian studies, professor. Ingush by nationality.

See also
 Eşrefoğlu Mosque, 13th-century mosque
 Lake Beyşehir, Turkey's third biggest lake, and the biggest freshwater lake.
 Kubadabad Palace
 Eflatunpınar, a spring with a monument by Hittites inside the nearby Lake Beyşehir National Park.
 Taşköprü, a historic regulator dam and pedestrian bridge

Notes

References

External links

 District governor's official website 
 District municipality's official website 
 Beyşehir Göl Gazetesi - Local Newspaper
 Beyşehir Pictures and some information
 Beyşehir Pictures, very many of the wonderful mosque

Cities in Turkey
Populated places in Konya Province
Beyşehir District
Pamphylia
Ancient Greek archaeological sites in Turkey
Roman sites in Turkey
Catholic titular sees in Asia
Districts of Konya Province